"No Me Ame" is a song by Puerto Rican rapper and singer Anuel AA, Jamaican record producer Rvssian, and American rapper and singer Juice Wrld, the latter appearing posthumously in this song. The song was released under Head Concussion Records and Sony Music Latin on 17 April 2020. A music video directed by Arrad Rahgoshay was released alongside the single.

"No Me Ame" debuted and peaked at number 15 on the Billboard Hot Latin Songs chart.

Background
"No Me Ame" was recorded months before Juice Wrld's death from a drug-related seizure on December 8, 2019. According to Rvssian, he and Anuel AA had recorded the track in Miami when he suggested that Juice Wrld would fit this song. Rvssian stated that Anuel was on board with the idea, going on to say that Anuel and Juice had "mutual respect" for each other and their music. Rvssian presented the song to Juice Wrld, and he immediately loved it and started recording for the song.

"No Me Ame" is the first collaboration between Anuel and Juice Wrld. Rvssian had previously worked with Juice Wrld on the song "Ring Ring" from his 2019 studio album Death Race for Love.

Music video
The music video, directed by Arrad Rahgoshay, was released alongside the single on 17 April 2020. The videoclip features all artists and was released as a tribute to Juice Wrld, who himself posthumously appears in the video as an angel through computer animation. Various references and images relating to Juice Wrld and his work were interspersed throughout the visual, including a scene at the end where Rvssian and other people release lit lanterns that form the number 999, a number that was used as Juice Wrld's symbol throughout his career and was also the name of his breakout EP.

References

2020 singles
2020 songs
Anuel AA songs
Juice Wrld songs
Songs written by Anuel AA
Songs written by Juice Wrld
Sony Music Latin singles
Spanglish songs
Songs released posthumously